Rusingaceros or Dicerorhinus leakeyi is an extinct genus of rhinocerotine rhinoceros known from the Miocene of Rusinga Island, Kenya.

Discovery
Rusingaceros is known from the holotype KNM-RU 2821, an almost perfectly preserved skull and associated mandible and from the paratype KNM-RU 2822, a maxilla and associated mandible. Both specimen were collected in the early Miocene site (Burdigalian stage) of Rusinga located in Lake Victoria in Kenya, from the Kulu Formation, dating to about 17.5 million years ago. Additional specimens described by Hooijer in 1966 from the Songhor and Napak localities, as well as more recently reported occurrences, are highly fragmentary and based mostly on isolated teeth. Rusingaceros represents the earliest rhino "of modern type, i.e., with a strong nasal and smaller frontal horn". This suggests that Rusingaceros belongs to subtribe Rhinocerotina, within the tribe Rhinocerotini.

Etymology
Rusingaceros was first named by Denis Geraads in 2010 and the type species is Rusingaceros leakeyi. It was originally described by Hooijer in 1966 as a new species of Dicerorhinus. The generic name is derived from the name of Rusinga Island, and from Greek ceros, "horn", thus, the name means "Rusinga Island's horn". The specific name honors Leakey.

References

Fossil taxa described in 2010
Miocene mammals of Africa
Miocene rhinoceroses